Koichi Tanaka (born October 20, 1971) is a Japanese mixed martial artist. He competed in the Featherweight division.

Mixed martial arts record

|-
| Win
| align=center| 3-11-1
| Manabu Kano
| Submission (rear-naked choke)
| Deep: Osaka Impact
| 
| align=center| 2
| align=center| 1:50
| Osaka, Japan
| 
|-
| Loss
| align=center| 2-11-1
| Yuichi Miyagi
| Decision (unanimous)
| Pancrase: Rising 1
| 
| align=center| 2
| align=center| 5:00
| Osaka, Japan
| 
|-
| Loss
| align=center| 2-10-1
| Kenji Takeshige
| Submission (toe hold)
| Pancrase: Blow 8
| 
| align=center| 2
| align=center| 2:38
| Osaka, Japan
| 
|-
| Loss
| align=center| 2-9-1
| Hiroshi Komatsu
| Decision (unanimous)
| Shooto: Gig West 2
| 
| align=center| 2
| align=center| 5:00
| Osaka, Japan
| 
|-
| Loss
| align=center| 2-8-1
| Akitoshi Tamura
| Decision (unanimous)
| Shooto: Gig East 5
| 
| align=center| 2
| align=center| 5:00
| Tokyo, Japan
| 
|-
| Loss
| align=center| 2-7-1
| Makoto Ishikawa
| Decision (unanimous)
| Shooto: Gig East 3
| 
| align=center| 2
| align=center| 5:00
| Tokyo, Japan
| 
|-
| Loss
| align=center| 2-6-1
| Yoshihiro Fujita
| Technical Submission (armbar)
| Shooto: Gig West 1
| 
| align=center| 1
| align=center| 3:58
| Osaka, Japan
| 
|-
| Loss
| align=center| 2-5-1
| Chikara Miyake
| Submission (rear naked choke)
| Shooto: Renaxis 5
| 
| align=center| 1
| align=center| 2:16
| Kadoma, Osaka, Japan
| 
|-
| Loss
| align=center| 2-4-1
| Yohei Nanbu
| Decision (majority)
| Shooto: Renaxis 3
| 
| align=center| 2
| align=center| 5:00
| Setagaya, Tokyo, Japan
| 
|-
| Loss
| align=center| 2-3-1
| Isao Tanimura
| Decision (majority)
| Shooto: Shooter's Passion
| 
| align=center| 2
| align=center| 5:00
| Setagaya, Tokyo, Japan
| 
|-
| Win
| align=center| 2-2-1
| Patrick Madayag
| Submission (rear naked choke)
| SB 10: SuperBrawl 10
| 
| align=center| 1
| align=center| 10:34
| Guam
| 
|-
| Loss
| align=center| 1-2-1
| Jutaro Nakao
| Submission (triangle choke)
| Shooto: Shooter's Dream
| 
| align=center| 1
| align=center| 3:56
| Setagaya, Tokyo, Japan
| 
|-
| Draw
| align=center| 1-1-1
| Masato Fujiwara
| Draw
| Shooto: Las Grandes Viajes 3
| 
| align=center| 2
| align=center| 5:00
| Tokyo, Japan
| 
|-
| Loss
| align=center| 1-1
| Tetsuji Kato
| Technical Submission (armbar)
| Shooto: Las Grandes Viajes 1
| 
| align=center| 1
| align=center| 1:01
| Tokyo, Japan
| 
|-
| Win
| align=center| 1-0
| Tae Yoon Han
| Submission (rear-naked choke)
| CMA: Octagon Challenge
| 
| align=center| 1
| align=center| 0:38
| Nagoya, Aichi, Japan
|

See also
List of male mixed martial artists

References

1971 births
Japanese male mixed martial artists
Featherweight mixed martial artists
Living people